Gar'in (lit. kernel) is a Hebrew term used for groups of people who moved together to Ottoman Palestine, British Palestine, and since 1948, Israel.

Background
Since the beginning of the 20th century, groups of people (usually circles of young friends) moved to Palestine/Israel together. The term "gar'in" originally referred to these groups who came from all across the world. Immigrating in a group provided the support necessary for survival. Many of these groups founded their own kibbutzim. The phenomenon of these groups has been ongoing since before Israel was established in 1948.

A variation of the original Gar'in groups still exist today. Whilst it is rare for gar'in to move to Israel together and form a community, the groups provide support for people interested in moving to Israel. They also provide forums for social-networking, information gathering, and encouragement.

The pre-military program Garin Tzabar facilitates and encourages the immigration of young Jews to Israel and supports them throughout their military service by placing them on Kibbutzim around the country.

References

Aliyah
Society of Israel
Yishuv